Kozmodemyansk is the name of several inhabited localities in Russia.

Urban localities
Kozmodemyansk, Mari El Republic, a town in the Mari El Republic; 

Rural localities
Kozmodemyansk, Sovetsky District, Mari El Republic, a village in Mikhaylovsky Rural Okrug of Sovetsky District in the Mari El Republic; 
Kozmodemyansk, Perm Krai, a selo in Karagaysky District of Perm Krai
Kozmodemyansk (selo), Yaroslavl Oblast, a selo in Melenkovsky Rural Okrug of Yaroslavsky District in Yaroslavl Oblast
Kozmodemyansk (settlement), Yaroslavl Oblast, a settlement in Melenkovsky Rural Okrug of Yaroslavsky District in Yaroslavl Oblast